Statistics of Empress's Cup in the 2006 season.

Overview
It was contested by 32 teams, and Tasaki Perule FC won the championship.

Results

1st round
Nagoya FC 0-3 Kibi International University
FC Adooma 0-4 Waseda University
Libelta Tokushima FC 0-6 Kagoshima Kamoike FC Asahina
Kamimura Gakuen High School 3-1 Kanagawa University
FC Re've 0-14 Hinomoto Gakuen High School
Osaka University of Health and Sport Sciences 2-1 Seiwa Gakuen High School
Fujieda Junshin High School 1-0 Fukui University of Technology Fukui High School
Nippon TV Menina 3-2 Tokiwagi Gakuken High School

2nd round
Renaissance Kumamoto FC 0-2 Kibi International University
Waseda University 1-0 Albirex Niigata
JEF United Chiba 6-0 Kagoshima Kamoike FC Asahina
Kamimura Gakuen High School 0-2 AS Elfen Sayama FC
Bunnys Kyoto SC 3-2 Hinomoto Gakuen High School
Osaka University of Health and Sport Sciences 1-4 Fukuoka J. Anclas
Ohara Gakuen JaSRA 5-0 Fujieda Junshin High School
Nippon TV Menina 2-0 Shimizudaihachi SC

3rd round
Nippon TV Beleza 9-0 Kibi International University
Waseda University 0-2 TEPCO Mareeze
INAC Leonessa 4-1 JEF United Chiba
AS Elfen Sayama FC 1-2 Okayama Yunogo Belle
Tasaki Perule FC 6-1 Bunnys Kyoto SC
Fukuoka J. Anclas 2-3 Iga FC Kunoichi
Speranza FC Takatsuki 0-2 Ohara Gakuen JaSRA
Nippon TV Menina 0-4 Urawa Reds

Quarterfinals
Nippon TV Beleza 4-0 TEPCO Mareeze
INAC Leonessa 1-1 (pen 3-5) Okayama Yunogo Belle
Tasaki Perule FC 2-0 Iga FC Kunoichi
Ohara Gakuen JaSRA 0-4 Urawa Reds

Semifinals
Nippon TV Beleza 0-1 Okayama Yunogo Belle
Tasaki Perule FC 2-2 (pen 4-3) Urawa Reds

Final
Okayama Yunogo Belle 0-2 Tasaki Perule FC
Tasaki Perule FC won the championship.

References

Empress's Cup
2006 in Japanese women's football